Bori City is a city in Khana Local Government Area, Rivers State, southern Nigeria. It is the birthplace of author and activist Ken Saro-Wiwa.

Bori is the traditional headquarters of the Ogoni people.
Bori serves as a commercial centre for the Ogoni, Andoni, Opobo
Annang and other ethnic nationalities of the Niger Delta Benue 
Congo. Bori is the host of the Ken Saro Wiwa Polytechnic Bori.

The Bori Urban Area has many adjoined communities including 
Bori Town, Bua Kaani, Yeghe, Zaakpon, Wiiyaakara, Betem 3, Kor, Kpong, and Bo-Ue. The Kaani people built and donated the first 
community secondary school in Nigeria to the Government of the Old
Rivers State of Nigeria.

Bori is the second largest city in Rivers state after Port Harcourt and the commercial center of the Rivers southeast senatorial district in Rivers state.

Bori is an agricultural hub in Rivers state involving the production of yams, gari, corn, cocoyam, palm oil and vegetables. Also available are fishes and meat. The Bori main market is a daily market where these products can be bought in large quantities for local or export market.

References

Cities in Rivers State